Sixpack Annie is a 1975 American International film aimed at the drive-in theatre circuit that was advertised with tags "Lookout... She's Legal Now! She's Out to Tear the Town Apart!" and "She's got the boys glad and the sheriff mad," amongst others. Another tagline used was "She's the pop top princess with the recyclable can." It starred Lindsay Bloom in the title role of Annie Bodine and Joe Higgins as Sheriff Waters. Other actors included Larry Mahan, Raymond Danton, Louisa Moritz, Bruce Boxleitner, Doodles Weaver and Stubby Kaye. Adverts depicted a pre-Daisy Duke kind of character, a buxom country gal in a tied-front top and tiny cut-off jeans opening an oversized can of beer. The picture carried an MPAA R rating due to language and one nude scene.

Plot
In the Southern United States community of Titwillow, two attractive young women, Annie (Lindsay Bloom) and Mary Lou (Jana Bellan) are on their way to work at the diner. Annie is behind the wheel of the pickup truck and speeds while drinking beer. The local redneck law officer, Sheriff Waters (Joe Higgins) pursues the truck to the diner but, upon entering, steps on a banana peel and takes a pratfall to the delight of diner old-timers Hank (Doodles Weaver) and Luke (Ronald Marriott) who were watching the peel.

The girls' employer, Aunt Tess (Danna Hansen), is on the verge of losing her place to the banker, Mr. Piker (Donald Elson), because she is 5,641 dollars and 87 cents behind on the mortgage. Sheriff Waters arrests Annie and her boyfriend Bobby Joe (Bruce Boxleitner) for nude swimming, but later releases her and offers to pay Aunt Tess' indebtedness if Annie would marry him. When Annie comes to him, however, he admits to having only a hundred dollars, intending to make up the remainder from "collecting parking tickets".

Annie and Mary Lou drive to Miami where Annie's sister Flora (Louisa Moritz) lives in an elegant apartment, hoping to borrow the mortgage money from her, but Flora's inadequate earnings appear to derive from men who pay her for sexually entertaining them. One of her customers, a nervous married man (Sid Melton), develops a sneezing problem and hides in a large wicker basket when Annie and Mary Lou arrive. Flora suggests that Annie find a sugar daddy to fund her needs, but wealthy Frenchman Louis Danton (Oscar Cartier) is revealed to have a Napoleon complex, replete with uniform, sword and wooden horse head on a stick. Mr. O'Meyer (Raymond Danton), a confidence trickster, who also calls himself "Oscar Meyer", claims to be "as rich as Rockefeller", but after tricking Annie into an intimate encounter, steals what little money she had and leaves her a note signed "The City Slicker". Finally, another candidate, moneyed Texan Jack Whittlestone (Richard Kennedy) turns out to have a violently possessive wife Edna (Montana Smoyer) who pushes a shotgun barrel up to his nose.

Discouraged and disillusioned, Annie and Mary Lou return to the diner in Titwillow where, just as Sheriff Waters and banker Piker arrive to finalize the foreclosure, Mr. Bates (Stubby Kaye), a salesman who is also a jewelry collector, examines Annie's necklace and offers her 7,000 dollars for it. The frustrated sheriff puts his wide-brimmed hat, into which Mary Lou had poured milk, on his head and, on his way out, bumps into a midget baker (unbilled Billy Barty) carrying white cream pies, one of which winds up smeared over the sheriff's face.

Cast

Lindsay Bloom as Sixpack Annie Bodine
Jana Bellan as Mary Lou
Joe Higgins as Sheriff Waters
Larry Mahan as Bustis
Raymond Danton as Mr. O'Meyer
Richard Kennedy as Jack Whittlestone
Danna Hansen as Aunt Tess
Pedro Gonzalez Gonzalez as Carmello
Bruce Boxleitner as Bobby Joe
Louisa Moritz as Flora

Vince Barnett as Bartender
Steve Randall as Long John
Doodles Weaver as Hank
Ronald Marriott as Luke
Donald Elson as Mr. Piker
Oscar Cartier as Louis Danton
Montana Smoyer as Edna Whittlestone
Ralph James as Ace
Terry Mace as John
Danny Michael Mann as Tony 
Stubby Kaye as Mr. Bates
Peter Dane
Billy Barty as Midget carrying pies in the final scene (uncredited)

Song credits
Song – "Sixpack Annie"; words and music by Minette Allton and Melissa Wilson; sung by Tim Hayfield
Song – "Them Red Hot Nuts"; words and music by Ron Carver and Denise Rabin

Reception
Columnist Vernon Scott wrote about Lindsay Bloom in Sixpack Annie, saying, "Lindsay Bloom plays a beer-guzzling, truck-driving Southern belle. Her scanty wardrobe reveals a great deal of Lindsay Bloom. 'Some of the language I use is pretty salty,' she said. 'That and the nude scene is why they gave it an 'R' rating. To give you an idea how subtle the picture is, Annie lives in a town named Titwillow. But it's a start. It's led to the possibility of a major movie at Warner Brothers. These days a young actress has to  take one step at a time."

See also
 List of American films of 1975

References

External links

 

American sex comedy films
American teen comedy films
Films about virginity
American International Pictures films
1975 films
1970s sex comedy films
Teen sex comedy films
Films scored by Raoul Kraushaar
1975 comedy films
1970s English-language films
1970s American films